Eugeniella is a genus of mostly leaf-dwelling (foliicolous) lichens in the family Pilocarpaceae. It contains 13 species. The genus was circumscribed in 2008 by lichenologists Robert Lücking, Emmanuël Sérusiaux, and Klaus Kalb, with Eugeniella psychotriae assigned as the type species. This lichen was originally called Patellaria psychotriae by Johannes Müller Argoviensis in 1881. The seven species that were initially included in the genus had previously been placed in the genera Bacidia (sensu lato) and Byssoloma. Several newly identified species from Australasia and Central and South America were later added. Most of the species grow on leaves, although four of the Australasian species grow on bark.

The genus name of Eugeniella is in honour of Eugênia Cristina Gonçalves Pereira (b.1960), a Brazilian botanist (Mycology and Lichenology) and
Professor at the Federal University of Pernambuco in Recife, Brasil.

Species
, Species Fungorum accepts 13 species of Eugeniella. The species distributions given in the list below are from McCarthy and Elix 2019.
Eugeniella atrichoides  – Brazil
Eugeniella corallifera  – neotropics
Eugeniella farinosa  – Australia
Eugeniella leucocheila  – neotropics; southeastern United States; tropical Africa
Eugeniella micrommata  – pantropical
Eugeniella newtoniana  – Costa Rica; West Africa; Thailand
Eugeniella nigrodisca  – Brazil
Eugeniella ortizii  – neotropics
Eugeniella pacifica  – Norfolk Island
Eugeniella palleola  – Nicaragua
Eugeniella psychotriae  – neotropics
Eugeniella usnica  – Australia
Eugeniella zeorina  – Norfolk Island

References

Pilocarpaceae
Lichen genera
Lecanorales genera
Taxa described in 2008
Taxa named by Emmanuël Sérusiaux
Taxa named by Klaus Kalb
Taxa named by Robert Lücking